Lasiognathus beebei is a species of wolftrap angler known from around the Hawaiian Islands in the Pacific Ocean and from around Madeira and Bermuda in the Atlantic. The females of this species grow to a length of  TL. This species is distinguishable by its hooks being placed on a short, transverse, fan-shaped distal escal appendage as opposed to the elongated, cylindrical appendage of all other species. Its species name honors naturalist William Beebe.

References
 

Thaumatichthyidae
Fish described in 1932